This is a list of diplomatic missions of the Democratic Republic of the Congo, excluding honorary consulates.

Africa

 Algiers (Embassy)

Luanda (Embassy)
Luena (Consulate-General)

Cotonou (Embassy)

Bujumbura (Embassy)

Yaoundé (Embassy)

Bangui (Embassy)

N'Djamena (Embassy)
Moundou (Consulate)

Brazzaville (Embassy)

Cairo (Embassy)

Addis Ababa (Embassy)

Libreville (Embassy)

Conakry (Embassy)

 Abidjan (Embassy)

Nairobi (Embassy)

 Nouakchott (Embassy)

Rabat (Embassy)

Maputo (Embassy)

Windhoek (Embassy)

Lagos (Embassy)

Kigali (Embassy)

Dakar (Embassy)

 Pretoria (Embassy)

Khartoum (Embassy)

Dar es Salaam (Embassy)
Kigoma (Consulate-General)

Lomé (Embassy)

Tunis (Embassy)

Kampala (Embassy)

Lusaka (Embassy)
Ndola (Consulate-General)

Harare (Embassy)

Americas

Buenos Aires (Embassy)

Brasilia (Embassy)

Ottawa (Embassy)

Havana (Embassy)

Washington, D.C. (Embassy)

Asia

Beijing (Embassy)

New Delhi (Embassy)
 
 Tel Aviv (Embassy)

Tokyo (Embassy)

 Riyadh (Embassy)

Seoul (Embassy)

 Ankara (Embassy)

Europe

Brussels (Embassy)
Antwerp (Consulate-General)

Prague (Embassy)

Paris (Embassy)

Berlin (Embassy)

Athens (Embassy)

 Rome (Embassy)

Rome (Embassy)

The Hague (Embassy)

Warsaw (Embassy)

Lisbon (Embassy)

Bucharest (Embassy)

Moscow (Embassy)

Belgrade (Embassy)

Madrid (Embassy)

Stockholm (Embassy)

Bern (Embassy)

London (Embassy)

Multilateral organisations

New York City
Geneva

Gallery

See also
Foreign relations of the Democratic Republic of the Congo

Notes

References

 
Congo, DR
Diplomatic missions